Philippe Rizzo (born 9 February 1981 in Sydney) is an Australian gymnast and Australian Institute of Sport scholarship holder. He was the first Australian to win a medal at the World Artistic Gymnastics Championships when he won silver on the horizontal bar in Ghent in 2001. He is also the first Australian to win a gold medal at the World Artistic Gymnastics Championships when he won the horizontal bar in Aarhus in 2006.

Rizzo is also a multiple Commonwealth Games gold medalist and has represented Australia at the 2000 and 2004 Summer Olympics.

His hobbies include playing the guitar and surfing. Rizzo joined the AIS in 1995. His family is highly involved with gymnastics and runs the Australian Academy of Sport, one of the most prestigious gyms in the country.

 Inaugural inductee to University of Canberra Sport Walk of Fame in 2022.

References

External links
 
 Philippe Rizzo at Gymnastics Australia (archived)
 
 
 
 
 

1981 births
Living people
Australian Institute of Sport gymnasts
Australian male artistic gymnasts
Gymnasts at the 1998 Commonwealth Games
Gymnasts at the 2002 Commonwealth Games
Gymnasts at the 2006 Commonwealth Games
Gymnasts at the 2000 Summer Olympics
Gymnasts at the 2004 Summer Olympics
World champion gymnasts
Commonwealth Games gold medallists for Australia
Medalists at the World Artistic Gymnastics Championships
Olympic gymnasts of Australia
Commonwealth Games silver medallists for Australia
Commonwealth Games bronze medallists for Australia
Commonwealth Games medallists in gymnastics
Universiade medalists in gymnastics
Universiade gold medalists for Australia
University of Canberra alumni
Medallists at the 1998 Commonwealth Games
Medallists at the 2002 Commonwealth Games
Medallists at the 2006 Commonwealth Games